The Canadian Champion Three-Year-Old Filly  is a  Canadian Thoroughbred horse racing honour created in 1975 by the Jockey Club of Canada. It is part of the Sovereign Awards program and is awarded annually to the top 3-Year-Old Filly Thoroughbred horse competing in Canada.

Past winners

1973 : Square Angel
1975 : Momigi
1976 : Bye Bye Paris
1977 : Northernette
1978 : La Voyageuse
1979 : Kamar
1980 : Par Excellance
1981 : Rainbow Connection
1982 : Avowal
1983 : Northern Blossom
1984 : Classy 'n Smart
1985 : La Lorgnette
1986 : Carotene
1987 : Once From Heaven
1988 : Tilt My Halo
1989 : Blushing Katy
1990 : Lubicon
1991 : Dance Smartly
1992 : Hope For A Breeze
1993 : Deputy Jane West
1994 : Alywow
1995 : Scotzanna
1996 : Silent Fleet
1997 : Cotton Carnival
1998 : Kirby's Song
1999 : Gandria
2000 : Catch the Ring
2001 : Dancethruthedawn
2002 : Lady Shari
2003 : Too Late Now
2004 : Eye of the Sphynx
2005 : Gold Strike 
2006 : Kimchi
2007 : Sealy Hill
2008 : Ginger Brew
2009 : Milwaukee Appeal
2010 : Biofuel
2011 : Inglorious
2012 : Irish Mission
2013 : Leigh Court
2014 : Lexie Lou
2015 : Academic
2016 : Caren
2017 : Holy Helena
2018 : Wonder Gadot
2019 : Desert Ride
2020 : Curlin's Voyage

References
 The official Sovereign Awards at the Jockey Club of Canada

Sovereign Award winners
Horse racing awards
Horse racing in Canada